This is a list of Polish television related events from 2007.

Events
6 May - Syzyfowe prace actor Krzysztof Tyniec and his partner Kamila Kajak win the fifth series of Taniec z Gwiazdami.
25 November - Na Wspólnej actress Anna Guzik and her partner Łukasz Czarnecki win the sixth series of Taniec z Gwiazdami.
16 December - Jolanta Rutowicz wins the third series of Big Brother.

Debuts
2 September - Big Brother (2001-2002, 2007-2008)

Television shows

1990s
Klan (1997–present)

2000s
M jak miłość (2000–present)
Na Wspólnej (2003–present)
Pierwsza miłość (2004–present)
Dzień Dobry TVN (2005–present)
Taniec z gwiazdami (2005-2011, 2014–present)

Ending this year

Births

Deaths

See also
2007 in Poland